Shoshurbari Zindabad is a 2002 Bangladeshi film released on Eid-ul-Fitr. The film marked the directorial debut of Debashish Biswas, son of Dilip Biswas.

Plot 
Badhon vows revenge from his aunt Dilruba Chowdhury, who falsely accused his widowed mother Rehana Akhter of being a thief and threw them out of her house to steal her winning lottery ticket and live a wealthy life.

Cast 
 Riaz - Badhon
 Shabnur - Prema Chodhury, Badhon's cousin and wife
 Sonia - Ria Chowdhury, Prema's sister and Badhon's cousin
 Rahul - Sajal
 Sajon - Rafi
 Bulbul Ahmed - Arman Chowdhury, Prema and Ria's father
 Rina Khan - Dilruba Chowdhury, Prema and Ria's mother
 Prabir Mitra - Rajib Khondokar
 Dolly Johur - Rehana Akter, Badhon's mother
 Misha Sawdagor - Badhon's friends
 ATM Shamsuzzaman - Hekmi (Hekmat Ali Munshi)
 Afzal Sharif - Tota
 Amol Bose - Mr. Mojumdar

Music 
The music for the film was composed by Gazi Mazharul Anwar and directed by Emon Saha.

Song list

References

External links
 

2002 films
2002 romantic comedy-drama films
Bengali-language Bangladeshi films
Bangladeshi romantic comedy-drama films
Films scored by Emon Saha
2000s Bengali-language films
2002 comedy films
2002 drama films